The Coupe de la Ligue Final 1996 was a football match held at Parc des Princes, Paris on April 6, 1996, that saw FC Metz defeat Olympique Lyonnais in a penalty shootout

Match details

External links
Report on LFP official site

1996
FC Metz matches
Olympique Lyonnais matches
Association football penalty shoot-outs
1995–96 in French football
April 1996 sports events in Europe
Football competitions in Paris
1996 in Paris